George B. McGill is an American politician and a Democrat who has been serving as Mayor of Fort Smith, Arkansas since January 1, 2019. Prior to becoming mayor, McGill had been a member of the Arkansas House of Representatives representing District 78 since January 14, 2013. he served in this position until he was sworn in as Mayor,  and was replaced by Jay Richardson. He is the first black person to serve as Fort Smith's mayor.

Education
McGill earned his Master of Business Administration from the University of Arkansas.

Elections
2012 When District 78 Representative Billy Gaskill left the Legislature and left the seat open, McGill was unopposed for both the May 22, 2012 Democratic Primary, and the November 6, 2012 General election. He would run unopposed in his 2014 and 2016 re-election bids as well.
2018 When McGill, who was still serving as a state representative, was elected mayor of Fort Smith after defeating two challengers. McGill received 4,417 votes, or 56.63 percent of the total vote. One of McGill's opponents, Wayne Haver, former principal of Southside High School, received 2,588 votes, or 33.18 percent, while his other opponent, Luis Andrade, a full-time student at the University of Arkansas at Fort Smith, earned 795 votes, or 10.19 percent.

Mayor of Fort Smith
On August 14, 2018, McGill was elected mayor of Fort Smith, Arkansas after winning 56.64 percent of the total vote. On January 1, 2019, in front of a crowd of hundreds at the Judge Isaac C. Parker Federal Building, McGill was sworn in as the first African-American mayor in Fort Smith's history.

References

External links
Official page at the Arkansas House of Representatives

George McGill at Ballotpedia
George B. McGill at OpenSecrets

Place of birth missing (living people)
Year of birth missing (living people)
Living people
African-American mayors in Arkansas
African-American state legislators in Arkansas
Democratic Party members of the Arkansas House of Representatives
Politicians from Fort Smith, Arkansas
University of Arkansas alumni
21st-century American politicians
21st-century African-American politicians